Pseudoruegeria insulae is a  Gram-negative, aerobic and non-motil bacterium from the genus of Pseudoruegeria which has been isolated from tidal flat sediments from the Yellow Sea in Korea.

References 

Rhodobacteraceae
Bacteria described in 2018